Tripas, in Mexican cuisine (known as chitterlings in English-speaking countries), are the small intestines of farm animals that have been cleaned, boiled and grilled. Tripas are used as filling for tacos, and then dressed with condiments such as cilantro, chopped onions, and chile sauce. They are also served with pico de gallo and guacamole.

Preparation
Tripas as prepared Mexican style require care by the cook, to avoid becoming rubbery. The tripas are placed in the top disc and filled with water while the lower disc is filled with wood or charcoal, thus creating the heat to cook. The tripas are boiled for several hours until tender, adding water as needed. Once they are tender the cook will allow the water to boil off and then finish the preparation by continuing to let them cook in their own fat. 

Tripas are prepared in three levels:
 'Soft' preparation is attained shortly after the water boils off while the tripas are still tender with a velvet like texture. Properly prepared, they should not be rubbery but should have some firmness to them. 
 'Medium Crispy' is reached by allowing the tripas to continue to cook in their own fat long enough for the exterior to crisp and harden. The center of the tripas are usually still soft and velvety.
 'Extra Crispy' preparation is reached by allowing the tripas to cook long enough to get crispy all the way through. Sometimes lard is added to the disco to reach this level of crispness but the true "Cocineros" (Mexican chefs) contend that it is best done using their own fat.

Portuguese tripas

Tripas or dobrada in Portuguese cuisine is beef stomach, and in the form of tripas à moda do Porto (tripes Porto style, with white beans, rice and carrots) is considered the traditional dish of the city of Porto, whose inhabitants are informally known as tripeiros. It is a typical and usual dish across many different regions of Portugal and is most widely known outside Porto as dobrada.

See also
 Gopchang

References

Portuguese cuisine
Mexican cuisine
Beef
Offal